Arthur F. Glasser (September 10, 1914 – December 8, 2009) was a missiologist and missionary who taught at Fuller Theological Seminary, last serving as Dean Emeritus of the School of Intercultural Studies. He also completed five years of missionary service in China.

Biography
Glasser was born in Paterson, New Jersey, and graduated from Cornell University, Faith Theological Seminary and Union Seminary in New York City. He served as a US Navy chaplain attached to the U.S. Marines during World War II. He was married to Alice Oliver and had three children.

He served in China with the China Inland Mission from 1945 to 1951, and saw the organization undergo major changes as the Chinese government changed and missionaries were expelled. He served as North American Director for almost fifteen years. He was Home Director of the Overseas Missionary Fellowship until 1970, and then Dean of the School of World Missions at Fuller Theological Seminary. In 1980 he retired, but continued to teach and mentor students until 1999 when he moved to Seattle.

Glasser served many years as editor of the Missiology journal and then president of the American Society of Missiology, and was actively involved in Jewish evangelism efforts. He was one of the pioneers of the academic discipline of missiology.

He wrote Announcing the Kingdom: The Story of God's Mission in the Bible (Baker Academic, 2003) which portrays missionary work as a central component of Christianity. Despite his emphasis on missions and the uniqueness of Christ for salvation, his open ended treatment of Acts 10 and 17 could lead people to assume that he believes people could be saved outside of Christ.

References

Interviews with Arthur Frederick Glasser

1914 births
2009 deaths
Missiologists
American Protestant missionaries
Protestant missionaries in China
United States Navy chaplains
Cornell University alumni
Faith Theological Seminary alumni
Union Theological Seminary (New York City) alumni
Academic journal editors
American expatriates in China
20th-century American clergy